Milltown is a village in Derbyshire, England. It is located 1 mile south east of Ashover and is part of Ashover civil parish. To the north of the village is Milltown Quarry, now closed. It is a small quarry, which was open for limestone extraction. Milltown once had a station on the Ashover Light Railway, which closed in 1936.

The listed Milltown Methodist Church is located in the village.

References

External links

Villages in Derbyshire
Towns and villages of the Peak District
North East Derbyshire District